Kooiker is a nickname for the Kooikerhondje, a dog breed, and a surname. Notable people with the surname include:

John Kooiker (born 1946), American politician, father of Sam
Leonie Kooiker (1927–2020), Dutch author of children's books
Sam Kooiker (born 1974), American politician, son of John

Dutch-language surnames